Patrick Ross is an American football coach. He is the head football coach at Graceland University in Lamoni, Iowa. Ross served as the head football coach at Ottawa University in Ottawa, Kansas from 2002 to 2003 and Lindenwood University in St. Charles, Missouri from 2004 to 2016.

Coaching career

Ottawa
Ross was the 28th head football coach at Ottawa University in Ottawa, Kansas and he held that position for two seasons, from 2002 until 2003. His career record at Ottawa was 14–7.

Lindenwood
Ross was the fifth head football coach at Lindenwood University in St. Charles, Missouri, a position he held from 2004 to 2016.  His record at Lindenwood was 93–57.

Head coaching record

References

External links
 Lindenwood profile

Year of birth missing (living people)
Living people
Graceland Yellowjackets football coaches
Kansas Wesleyan Coyotes football coaches
Lindenwood Lions football coaches
Ottawa Braves football coaches